Bryant Browning (born June 26, 1988) is an American football guard who is currently a free agent. He was signed by the Carolina Panthers as an undrafted free agent in 2011. He played college football for Ohio State University.

Early life

Bryant Browning was born to then 28 year old Valerie Browning in 1988.
After Browning's mother Valerie died when he was 12 years old he went on to play football at Glenville High School. Bryant was a three star recruit going into College.

College

Bryant played College football for Ohio State where he was one of six team captains later in his college career and was a starter for three seasons. While at Ohio State, Bryant also was an Academic All-Big Ten as a freshman, sophomore and junior.

Pro career

After going undrafted in the 2010 NFL Draft, Browning caught on with the Carolina Panthers, whom he played for during the 2011 season.

After football

Since being released by the Miami Dolphins in 2015, Bryant has not played in the National Football League.
Recently, Browning and a former Buckeye teammate opened a restaurant; The Pit BBQ Grille in Columbus, Ohio.  Bryant also runs football camps with other former Buckeyes in his life after football.

References

External links
Carolina Panthers biography
Ohio State Buckeyes biography

1988 births
Living people
Players of American football from Cleveland
American football offensive guards
Ohio State Buckeyes football players
Carolina Panthers players
Cleveland Browns players